Mustafa Gundogdu (born 2 October 1966), best known under his stage name Mousse T., is a German-Turkish DJ, record producer, film composer and judge on season 15 of Deutschland sucht den Superstar, the German version of Pop Idol. He is best known for the 1998 house hit "Horny '98" (famous for the hook "I'm horny") and for his collaboration with Tom Jones on the 2000 hit "Sex Bomb",<ref>IMO Records. "Mousse T  Biography" , IMO Records' Retrieved on 14 March 2011.</ref> from Jones' 1999 album Reload.

Mousse T. is one of the first producers of house music in his country, alongside contemporaries Boris Dlugosch, DJ Tonka and Ian Pooley.

Biography
He was born in Hagen, Germany in 1966 to Turkish parents. He started learning music at age of 13. He began his career in 1990 as keyboard player for a small band known as "Fun Key B". At the same time, he set up his own recording studio and began DJing in the city of Hannover. Besides working on his own productions, usually with partner Errol Rennalls, Mousse T. also wrote and produced tracks for other artists. In 1993, he founded, along with Rennalls, Peppermint Jam Records, a label specializing in uplifting house and melodic acid jazz music.

His 1998 production "Horny '98" featuring Hot 'n' Juicy (and a chorus sung by Inaya Day on vocals) reached the top of the Billboard dance charts in the late 1990s and Top 20 in the UK and Australia. It was also featured on Chef Aid: The South Park Album. His first album, Gourmet de Funk, was released in 2002. In 2004, he once again entered the Single Charts with his song "Is It 'Cos I'm Cool?", which is featured on his second album, All Nite Madness, also released in 2004. The song features the vocals of Emma Lanford. In the same year he produced the summer hit "Il Grande Baboomba" of the Italian singer Zucchero Fornaciari, in his album Zu & Co., and he took part in the concert at the Royal Albert Hall in London held in May 2004, with the other guests of the Italian bluesman.

In 2005, Mousse T. performed with Emma Lanford and represented Lower Saxony in the Bundesvision Song Contest 2005 with the song "Right About Now", placing 4th with 85 points. In 2006, Loo & Placido released a mash-up called "Horny as a Dandy". The song fused the vocals of "Horny '98" and the music of "Bohemian Like You" by The Dandy Warhols.

In 2006, Mousse T. collaborated Turkish singer Tarkan and composed 3 different remixes for the track Start the Fire of released album named Come Closer.

In 2007, he wrote and produced the music for Marc Rothemund's film: Pornorama. His music has been featured in several films and TV series in both the U.S. and internationally.

In 2018, Mousse T. joined the jury of Deutschland sucht den Superstar, the German equivalent to Pop Idol.

In 2020, Mousse T. was ranked number one at the Top House Artists of 2020 by Traxsource.

Discography
Albums

Singles
Mousse T.
 Most tracks co-written by Errol Rennalls''

Afropeans
 "Pianolick" (2000)
 "No. 1" (2001)
 "Everybody/Fallin'" (2003)
 "Afropeans EP" (2004)
 "Better Things" with Inaya Day (2004)

Other aliases
 "Don't Stop", as Fresh & Fly with Hans Hahn (1989)
 "African Rhythm", as Fresh & Fly with Ralf Droesemeyer and Jörg Rump (1991)
 "Family of Music", as F.O.M. with Ralf Droesemeyer (1991)
 "C'mon Get Up", as F.O.M. with Ralf Droesemeyer (1991)
 "Mind Flavor EP", as Mind Flavour (1995)
 "Odyssey One", as Federation X with Grant Nelson (1996)
 "Keep Pushin'", as Booom! with Boris Dlugosch and Inaya Day (1996)
 "Hold Your Head Up High", as Booom! with Boris Dlugosch and Inaya Day (1997)
 "Miami Special", as Peppermint Jam Allstars with Boris Dlugosch and Michi Lange (2001)

(Co-)Production for other artists
 Psyche – "Angel Lies Sleeping" (1991)
 Marc Davis – "Moviestar" (1992)
 Ve Ve – "We've Got Love" (1995)
 Raw Instinct – "De La Bass" (1996)
 Ferry Ultra feat. Roy Ayers – "Dangerous Vibes" (1997)
 Bootsy Collins feat. MC Lyte – "I'm Leavin U (Gotta Go, Gotta Go)" (1997)
 Byron Stingily – "Sing a Song" (1997)
 Randy Crawford – "Wishing on a Star" (1997)
 Cunnie Williams – "Saturday" (1999)
 Tom Jones – "Sex Bomb" (1999)
 Monie Love – "Slice of da Pie" (2000)
 Ann Nesby – "Love Is What We Need" (2001)
 No Angels – "Let's Go to Bed" (2002)
 Inaya Day – "Nasty Girl" (2004)
 Se:Sa feat. Sharon Phillips – "Like This Like That" (2007)

Remixes
 1996 Mr. President - "Coco Jamboo" (Club Mix Radio, Extended, and Dangerous Dub)
 1997 Michael Jackson – "Ghosts"
 1997 Nuyorican Soul - "Runaway" (Jazz Funk Experience, and Soul Dub)
 2001 Shakedown - "At Night"
 2006 Boney M - "Sunny" (Radio, Extended, and Sexy Disco Club Mix)
 2006 Tarkan – "Start the Fire" (Radio Mix)
 2006 Tarkan – "Start The Fire" (Radio Instrumental Mix)
 2006 Tarkan – "Start The Fire" (Abi Club Mix)
 2017 Camelphat & Elderbrook – "Cola" (Mousse T.'s Glitterbox Mix)
 2018 Purple Disco Machine ft Baxter – "Encore"
 2018 Selace – "So Hooked On Your Lovin"
 2019 Kylie Minogue – "Step Back in Time"
 2019 The Vision featuring Andreya Triana - Heaven (Mousse T.'s Disco Shizzle Remix)
 2020 DAVIE - Testify (Mousse T.'s Funky Shizzle Remix)
 2020 Mike Dunn - If I Can’t Get Down (Mousse T.'s Funky Shizzle Mix)
 2020 Wankelmut & Anna Leyne - Free At Last (Mousse T. Remix)

See also
 Marianne Rosenberg

References

External links

 

1966 births
Living people
People from Hagen
Club DJs
German DJs
Remixers
German house musicians
German male musicians
German dance musicians
German people of Turkish descent
Participants in the Bundesvision Song Contest
Deutschland sucht den Superstar judges
AM PM Records artists
Electronic dance music DJs